WPHL may refer to:

 WPHL-TV, a television station (channel 17 digital) licensed to Philadelphia, Pennsylvania, United States
 Western Professional Hockey League, professional league from 1996 to 2001
 Western Pennsylvania Hockey League, semi-professional league in the early 1900s